Malicious compliance (also known as  malicious obedience) is the behavior of strictly following the orders of a superior despite knowing that compliance with the orders will have an unintended or negative result. The term usually implies following an order in such a way that ignores or otherwise undermines the order's intent, but follows it to the letter. It is a form of passive-aggressive behavior that is often associated with poor management-labor relationships, micromanagement, a generalized lack of confidence in leadership, and resistance to changes perceived as pointless, duplicative, dangerous, or otherwise undesirable. It is common in organizations with top-down management structures lacking morale, leadership or mutual trust. In U.S. law, this practice has been theorized as a form of uncivil obedience, and it is a technique which is also used in art practice.

Managers can avoid this by not making excessive or incomprehensible demands of employees.

Examples 
As an example of malicious compliance, a group of U.S. firefighters were required to wear self-contained breathing apparatus for safety reasons. In response, they took to wearing the equipment on their backs but not using it. This made their work less efficient than if they had not been wearing the breathing apparatus at all. A further instruction was required that ordered them to wear and use the apparatus.

Another example is a project manager going along with a project, knowing it is impossible to complete. While the rest of their team knows the task is insurmountable, they cut corners to achieve some sort of result.

Malicious compliance is common in production situations in which employees and middle management are measured based on meeting certain quotas or performance projections. Examples of this include:
 Employees at a factory shipping product to customers too early so their inventory is reduced to meet a projection;
 Software quality-checkers reporting every minor issue with a program because they are measured based on the number of errors they report (regardless of whether the glitches are important or not);
 Production plants refusing shipments of raw material at month-end so that monthly completion projections are met, even if doing so causes a negative impact on customer deliverables and overall production figures.

Malicious compliance was common in the Soviet Union's command economy; examples are used in class group assignments in western universities to hypothetically show differences between the Soviet command economy and a free market.

See also
 Counterproductive work behavior
 Gaming the system
 The Good Soldier Švejk
 Washington Monument Syndrome
 White mutiny
 Work-to-rule

References 

Activism by type
Labor disputes
Protest tactics